Noh Ah-Reum (born December 18, 1991) is a South Korean female short track speed skater.

Career
Noh won three distances and the overall classification at the 2008 World Junior Championships in Bolzano. She became the overall champion again at the 2009 World Junior Championships in Sherbrooke.

Career highlights

ISU World Junior Short Track Speed Skating Championships
2008 - Bolzano,  1st overall classification
1st at 1500m, 1500m super final and 1000m

Filmography

Television series

References

External links
ISU profile
2008 ISU World Junior Championships, Italy

1991 births
Living people
Competitors at the 2015 Winter Universiade
Four Continents Short Track Speed Skating Championships medalists
South Korean female short track speed skaters
Universiade silver medalists for South Korea
Universiade medalists in short track speed skating
21st-century South Korean women